Cephalocladia is a genus of moths in the family Megalopygidae.

Species
Cephalocladia fulvicornis (Dognin, 1923)
Cephalocladia mossi Hopp, 1927
Cephalocladia werneri Hopp, 1927

References

Megalopygidae
Megalopygidae genera